Cnaphalocrocis is a genus of moths of the family Crambidae. The genus was described by Julius Lederer in 1863.

Species
Cnaphalocrocis araealis (Hampson, 1912)
Cnaphalocrocis bilinealis (Hampson, 1891)
Cnaphalocrocis brunneofusalis (Hampson, 1917)
Cnaphalocrocis binalis (Zeller, 1852)
Cnaphalocrocis carstensziana (Rothschild, 1916)
Cnaphalocrocis cochrusalis (Walker, 1859)
Cnaphalocrocis conformis (Meyrick, 1934)
Cnaphalocrocis daisensis (Shibuya, 1929)
Cnaphalocrocis didialis (Viette, 1958)
Cnaphalocrocis euryterminalis (Hampson, 1917)
Cnaphalocrocis exigua (Butler, 1879)
Cnaphalocrocis fusifascialis (Hampson, 1896)
Cnaphalocrocis grisealis (Ghesquière, 1942)
Cnaphalocrocis grucheti (Viette, 1976)
Cnaphalocrocis hemicrossa (Meyrick, 1887)
Cnaphalocrocis hexagona (Lower, 1903)
Cnaphalocrocis iolealis (Walker, 1859)
Cnaphalocrocis laticostalis (Hampson, 1912)
Cnaphalocrocis latimarginalis (Hampson, 1891)
Cnaphalocrocis liliicola (Ghesquière, 1942)
Cnaphalocrocis limbalis (Wileman, 1911)
Cnaphalocrocis loxodesma (Turner, 1915)
Cnaphalocrocis medinalis (Guenée, 1854)
Cnaphalocrocis nawae (Matsumura, 1920)
Cnaphalocrocis patnalis Bradley, 1981
Cnaphalocrocis pauperalis (Strand, 1918)
Cnaphalocrocis pilosa Warren, 1896
Cnaphalocrocis poeyalis (Boisduval, 1833)
Cnaphalocrocis rutilalis (Walker, 1859)
Cnaphalocrocis sanitalis Snellen, 1880
Cnaphalocrocis similis Hedemann, 1894
Cnaphalocrocis sordidalis Rothschild, 1915
Cnaphalocrocis stereogona (Meyrick, 1886)
Cnaphalocrocis subvenilialis (Snellen, 1895)
Cnaphalocrocis trapezalis (Guenée, 1854)
Cnaphalocrocis trebiusalis (Walker, 1859)

Former species
Cnaphalocrocis perpersalis Möschler, 1890
Cnaphalocrocis ruptalis (Walker, 1866)

References

Spilomelinae
Crambidae genera
Taxa named by Julius Lederer